Anthony Gauvin (born 15 November 1973) is a retired French footballer who played as a defender. During his career, he assisted Chamois Niortais, Saint-Étienne, Nice, Lorient, Le Havre, Brest and Fontenay-le-Comte.

He is currently the manager of Fontenay-le-Comte, a position he has held since 2008.

Whilst at Lorient Gauvin played in the 2002 Coupe de France Final in which they beat SC Bastia.

References

Anthony Gauvin career statistics at FootballDatabase.eu
Anthony Gauvin profile at chamoisfc79.fr

1973 births
Living people
People from Niort
French footballers
French football managers
Association football defenders
Chamois Niortais F.C. players
AS Saint-Étienne players
OGC Nice players
FC Lorient players
Le Havre AC players
Stade Brestois 29 players
Vendée Fontenay Foot players
Ligue 1 players
Ligue 2 players
Sportspeople from Deux-Sèvres
Footballers from Nouvelle-Aquitaine